Zeami is a crater on Mercury. Its name was adopted by the International Astronomical Union in 1976, after the Japanese dramatist and playwright Zeami Motokiyo.

Hollows are present within Zeami.

The crater Stevenson is to the northeast of Zeami.  Sophocles is to the south, and Goya is to the southwest.

Views

External links
 Zeami in color, from the Planetary Society

References

Impact craters on Mercury